Gari is a genus of bivalve molluscs in the family Psammobiidae, known as sunset shells.

Species
The following species have been accepted by the database World Register of Marine Species (WoRMS):
 Gari bicarinata
 Gari circe (Mörch, 1876) 
 Gari costulata (Turton, 1822)
 Gari depressa (Pennant, 1777) – large sunset shell
 Gari elongata Lamarck 
 Gari fervensis (Gmelin, 1791) – the Faroe sunset shell
 Gari granulifera
 Gari intermedia (Deshayes, 1855) 
 Gari juliae Willan & Huber, 2007 
 Gari lessoni (de Blainville, 1826) 
 Gari linhares Simone, 1998 
 Gari maculosa (Lamarck, 1818) 
 Gari ornata (Deshayes, 1854)
 Gari pseudoweinkauffi Cosel, 1989 
 Gari sharabatiae Rusmore-Villaume, 2005 
 Gari tellinella (Lamarck, 1818)
 Gari violacea
 Gari wenkauffi (Lamarck, 1818) 

The following species have been found in other databases :
 Gari californica (Conrad, 1849) – California sunset clam 
 Gari convexa (Reeve, 1857) 
 Gari edentula (Gabb, 1869) 
 Gari fucata (Hinds, 1845) – painted sunset clam 
 Gari helenae Olsson, 1961 
 Gari lineolata (Gray, 1835) – pink sunset shell 
 Gari maxima (Deshayes, 1855) 
 Gari regularis (Carpenter, 1864) 
 Gari stangeri (Gray, 1843) – painted sunset shell

References

 ITIS
 Miller M & Batt G, Reef and Beach Life of New Zealand, William Collins (New Zealand) Ltd, Auckland, New Zealand 1973

Psammobiidae
Bivalve genera